Neocalyptis affinisana is a species of moth of the family Tortricidae first described by Francis Walker in 1863. It is found in India, Sri Lanka, Vietnam, Indonesia, Taiwan and Japan.

The wingspan is 13–14 mm. It is a polyphagous pest of several plants.

References

Moths described in 1863
Neocalyptis